Hippie Hippie Shake is an unreleased British drama film produced by Working Title Films. It is based on a memoir by Richard Neville, editor of the Australian satirical magazine Oz, and chronicles his relationship with girlfriend Louise Ferrier, the launch of the London edition of Oz amidst the 1960s counterculture, and the staff's trial for distributing an obscene issue. Hippie Hippie Shake stars Cillian Murphy as Richard Neville, with Sienna Miller as Louise.

British film production company Working Title began development of Hippie Hippie Shake in 1998, but the film was repeatedly delayed, changing directors and screenwriters. In September 2007, the film finally began principal photography. In 2011, Working Title said that the film would not be released in cinemas.

Premise
Hippie Hippie Shake follows the love story of Oz editor Richard Neville and Louise Ferrier, as Neville and his cohorts launch the London edition of the radical magazine, and are put on trial for publishing an obscene issue. The film serves as a metaphorical journey through the 1960s in London.

Cast

Pre-production delays
In October 1998, British film production company Working Title Films announced the development of the film Hippie Hippie Shake, based on Hippie Hippie Shake: The Dreams, the Trips, the Trials, the Love-ins, the Screw Ups: The Sixties, a memoir by Oz magazine editor Richard Neville.  Screenwriter Don Macpherson was hired to write the adapted screenplay for the film, which was slated to begin production in 1999, depending on Working Title's status following the breakup of PolyGram Filmed Entertainment.

Production did not begin as anticipated. Working Title restarted development in February 2002 with director Shekhar Kapur attached to direct based on a script by Tom Butterworth. Again, the project was delayed.

In May 2007, Working Title announced its third attempt to produce Hippie Hippie Shake, this time with director Beeban Kidron and screenwriter Lee Hall. The film, which would be distributed by Universal Pictures, was slated to begin production in the autumn of 2007.

Production

Following William Nicholson's involvement with the script, principal photography began on 17 September 2007. Writer Richard Neville acknowledged the long development history of the film, but considered the film appropriate for the contemporary state of affairs: "Given that the world is at war, it couldn't be better timing to highlight the crazy, fun and political times of the 1960s... I think the timing is pretty terrific. Enough time has gone by to perhaps look at that era in a new perspective and help us reflect on what's going on today," Neville said.

Parts of the film were shot in the Hampstead district of London, and a house in South Hill Park was used as the exterior of Greer's home. Until his death, South Hill Park was the home of Anthony Minghella, the film director and father of Max Minghella. All Saint's Road was also used as a substitute for King's Road.

Release delays

In July 2009, "creative differences" led Beeban Kidron to quit during post-production; her husband, screenwriter Lee Hall, had left the production earlier. According to The Times, Kidron said "I worked on the film for as long as I could and as hard as I could and then I had to walk away. It was very wounding." A 100-print release was scheduled for February 2010, but never happened.

Reactions
The people depicted in the film have had a range of reactions to the film.

In July 2007, in a piece for The Guardian, feminist author Germaine Greer vehemently expressed her displeasure at being depicted, writing, "You used to have to die before assorted hacks started munching your remains and modelling a new version of you out of their own excreta." Greer refused to be involved with the film, just as she declined to read Neville's memoir before it was published (he had offered to change anything she found offensive). She did not want to meet with Emma Booth, who portrays her in the film, and concluded her article with her only advice for the actress: "Get an honest job." Booth had just told The Brisbane Times, "It's going to be a bit scary playing her. Germaine is this ballsy lady. I am sure she is going to hate me."

In contrast to Greer, Louise Ferrier met with director Kidron to discuss the film at length, and expressed the opinion that Kidron was "certainly working to make it authentic." Ferrier said she was unfamiliar with the work of Sienna Miller, the actress portraying her.

Publisher Felix Dennis was also more cooperative, and agreed to meet up with Chris O'Dowd, the actor who portrays him in the film. "He was an incredibly charismatic man", O'Dowd stated.

Test screening reviews
Several advance reviews of Hippie Hippie Shake have surfaced across the Internet.  Harry Palmer from Ain't It Cool News said, "There are some predictable scenes, some hammy acting, some bad jokes, but they couldn't spoil my enjoyment. I'm sorry, but I really liked it." He was especially impressed by Sienna Miller, saying, "And yes, there is full-frontal nudity from Sienna. She has a natural, un-made-up look for most of the film, one might even say uglified in places. But when kneeling in a garden drenched in daisies and with a beatific expression on her face, she poses for an 'alternative' Oz centrefold – she is stunningly, stunningly beautiful." Jandy Stone from The Frame opined, "all the actors carry their parts well." Of the film, she concluded that "since there’s no release date in sight yet, they may well improve it into quite a decent '60s biopic." Matt Robinson said, "Starring Cillian Murphy and Sienna Miller the film captures the time period effectively presenting both drama, sex and drugs against a setting of media scrutiny and restrictions." He wrote, "Colourful, funny and dramatic this is not only a good film it is educational too. A good document of history that many journalists and nonjournalists will enjoy."
However one more succinct  review  should be mentioned. Felix Dennis quoted in The Times of July 21, 2009  wrote: “I was eventually, after asking several times, permitted to see a copy of the film, which I think is quite possibly the worst film to be made in the 21st century... an absolute stinker...a dog’s breakfast."

See also
The Trials of Oz, a BBC dramatisation of the Oz obscenity trial.

References

External links

Working Title Films films
Cancelled films
Unreleased films
2000s unfinished films
Hippie films
British drama films
Films directed by Beeban Kidron
2010s English-language films
Films produced by Eric Fellner
Films produced by Tim Bevan
Films scored by Dario Marianelli
2000s British films